Thomas Paul Hodson (born January 28, 1967) is a former American football quarterback in the National Football League (NFL). He played college football for the LSU Tigers of Louisiana State University, where he holds several school passing records. In the NFL, he served primarily as a back-up quarterback, playing for four different teams in six seasons, though he did start a number of games for the New England Patriots in the early 1990s.

Early life
Hodson was born in Mathews, Louisiana in Lafourche Parish. He played quarterback at Central Lafourche High School, where he passed for 4,361 yards and 36 touchdowns. He also played basketball, averaging 27.4 points per game.

College career
In 1986, Hodson went to Louisiana State University (LSU). As quarterback for LSU's football team, Hodson led LSU to two SEC Championships, first as a freshman (1986) and then as a junior (1988). During his 44 regular season games at LSU (1986–1989), Hodson passed for 9,115 yards and 69 touchdowns, becoming the first quarterback in SEC history to surpass 8,000 career passing yards, and the first quarterback in SEC history to surpass 60 career passing touchdowns. Hodson passed for over 2,000 yards during each of his four seasons at LSU, becoming the third player in NCAA history to achieve that feat. During his freshman season, Hodson was voted first team All-SEC, becoming the first LSU quarterback to be awarded that honor since the legendary Bert Jones (first team All-SEC, 1972). Hodson was selected first team All-SEC during each of his four seasons at LSU, the only player in school history to achieve that feat.

During Hodson's freshman season (1986), he led LSU to its first AP Top 10 finish since 1970 and its first SEC Championship since 1970. In Hodson's first game, he led No. 14 LSU to a 35–17 victory over No. 7 Texas A&M. Later in the season, Hodson led No. 18 LSU to a 14–10 victory at No. 6 Alabama.

During Hodson's sophomore season (1987), he led LSU to its first AP Top 5 finish since 1961. Major victories included No. 6 LSU's 17–3 victory at No. 15 Texas A&M, No. 9 LSU's 34–9 victory at Tennessee (LSU's first win ever at Neyland Stadium), No. 4 LSU's 13–13 tie with No. 7 Ohio State, No. 7 LSU's 13–10 victory over No. 19 Florida, No. 7 LSU's 26–23 victory at No. 16 Georgia, and No. 7 LSU's 30–13 victory over No. 8 South Carolina in the Gator Bowl.

During Hodson's junior season (1988), he led LSU to another SEC Championship, and a No. 19 finish in the AP Poll. Major victories included No. 18 LSU's 27–0 victory over No. 10 Texas A&M, LSU's 7–6 victory over No. 4 Auburn (the famous Earthquake Game), and No. 13 LSU's 19–18 victory at No. 18 Alabama.

*Does not include bowl games.

†Led SEC

NFL
Hodson was selected 59th overall in the 1990 NFL Draft by the New England Patriots. He started the last 6 games of his rookie season, passing for 968 yards. However, during Hodson's next two seasons with the Patriots, he was only allowed 68 passing attempts in 1991 and 91 passing attempts in 1992. From 1993 to 1996, Hodson served as a back-up for the Miami Dolphins, the Dallas Cowboys, and the New Orleans Saints, but saw no playing time except for 5 passing attempts in 1995 for the Saints.

Later life
On February 2, 2005, The Boston Globe wrote a feature on Hodson. In the article, the Globe quotes Hodson as saying: "Although I didn't have great success as a professional I played six years and it was a great honor to play in the NFL. I am grateful I was able to play six years." The Globe reported that Hodson lives in Baton Rouge with his wife and his 10-year-old identical twin daughters, and quoted Hodson as saying that he lives in Baton Rouge because he has "fond memories" at LSU and because it is "a good place to raise a family."

See also
 LSU Tigers football statistical leaders

Footnotes

1967 births
Living people
American football quarterbacks
New England Patriots players
Miami Dolphins players
Dallas Cowboys players
New Orleans Saints players
LSU Tigers football players
People from Lafourche Parish, Louisiana
Players of American football from Louisiana